Ernst Thälmann is an East German film in two parts about the life of Ernst Thälmann, leader of the Communist Party of Germany during much of the Weimar Republic, directed by Kurt Maetzig and starring Günther Simon in the title role. The first part, Ernst Thälmann - Sohn seiner Klasse (Son of his Class), was released in 1954. It was followed by the 1955 sequel. Ernst Thälmann - Führer seiner Klasse (Leader of his Class).

Plot

Ernst Thälmann - Son of his Class
After fellow soldier Johannes Harms reports that a revolution has broken out at home, Thälmann - who leads a revolutionary cell on the Western Front - and his friend Fiete Jansen rebel against their officers, Zinker and Quadde, and desert. Harms dies in a shelling. In Berlin, the American capitalist Mr. McFuller demands to crush the Spartacists. Zinker, now a member of the Freikorps, murders Karl Liebknecht and Rosa Luxemburg. Thälmann hears of it and promises their sacrifice will not be in vain. Jansen falls in love with Harms' daughter, Änne.

When Hamburg faces an attack by Zinker's forces, as part of the Kapp Putsch, the workers organize a general strike; after laborers are shot by the rebels, Thälmann ignores the bourgeoisie Social Democrats who reject violence, ambushes the Freikorps and captures their officers. The Social Democrat Police Senator Höhn frees them after they lightheartedly promise not to use violence.

Thälmann makes a speech in the USPD congress, calling to unite with the KPD, when the Soviet steamship Karl Liebknecht, loaded with wheat for the city's unemployed, reaches the port. Höhn sends Quadde, now a police captain, to prevent the distribution of the cargo, but after a stand-off the police retreat. Thälmann visits Vladimir Lenin and Joseph Stalin in Moscow with other German communists.

Thälmann and his friends organize a communist uprising in Hamburg, and manage to hold out against the Reichswehr and the police. Jansen killes Zinker. Then, a delegate from the Central Committee announces that armed struggle is no longer the policy of the party, and the weapons promised to them by the leadership will not arrive. The communists are forced to flee. Jansen is sentenced to death, but eventually his life is spared. Thälmann appears in the Hamburg harbor and promises not to abandon the struggle.

Ernst Thälmann - Leader of his Class
In 1930, Fiete Jansen is released from jail and is reunited with his wife, Änne. Thälmann, now a member of the Reichstag and chief of the KPD, assists the coal miners in the Ruhr to organize a massive strike after their wages are cut. When the presidential elections take place, veteran SPD member Robert Dirhagen is reluctant to support Paul von Hindenburg, although this is the party line. Thälmann calls for class unity against the Nazis, but the SPD leaders do not want to collaborate with him.

In the elections for parliament, the KPD gains many seats and the Nazis lose two million votes. However, the Ruhr industrialists and Mr. McFuller support Adolf Hitler. Dirhagen is enraged to hear that the SPD will not oppose Franz von Papen's decision to allow Hitler into the government and tears his party card. The Nazis seize power.

The Nazis burn the Reichstag and accuse the communists, arresting many, including Thälmann and Dirhagen. Wilhelm Pieck and Jansen plan to rescue their leader with the aid of an Orpo jailer, but the SS guards - commanded by Quadde, now a SS Sturmbannführer - foil the plot. Fiete escapes abroad, joining the Thälmann Battalion in Spain, and later - after the Second World War begins - the Red Army's 143rd Guards Tank Division 'Ernst Thälmann'. Änne is arrested by the Gestapo. Hamburg is bombed, and she dies in her cell.

In August 1944, a German corps is encircled by the Red Army. Hitler orders its commanders to fight to the end. The Soviets send in Jansen with a group of German communists to convince the soldiers to defy the SS and surrender. Eventually, the Ernst Thälmann Division soldiers break through the German lines, liberate the local concentration camp - in which Dirwagen was held - and accept the German surrender after the SS were overpowered by Jansen's men. The communist Jansen and the Social Democrat Dirhagen shake hands. In Berlin, Thälmann leaves his cell to be executed, while contemplating on Pavel Korchagin's words from How the Steel Was Tempered: "...All my life, all my strength were given to the finest cause in all the world - the fight for the liberation of mankind."

Cast

Günther Simon as Ernst Thälmann
Hans-Peter Minetti as Fiete Jansen
Erich Franz as Arthur Vierbreiter
Erika Dunkelmann as Martha Vierbreiter
Wolf Kaiser as Zinker
Werner Peters as Gottlieb Quadde
Nikolai Kryuchkov as Soviet colonel
Michel Piccoli as Maurice Rouger
Siegfried Weiss as industrialist
Fritz Diez as Adolf Hitler
Fred Delmare as soldier
Hannjo Hasse as army officer
Horst Kube as concentration camp commandant
Angela Brunner as Irma Thälmann
Arthur Pieck as Wilhelm Pieck (part 1)
Hans Wehrl as Wilhelm Pieck (part 2)
Karl Brenk as Walter Ulbricht
Gerd Wehr as Wilhelm Florin
Karl Weber as Friedrich Ebert
Martin Flörchinger as Karl Liebknecht (part 1)/Saarland delegate (part 2)
Judith Harms as Rosa Luxemburg
Kurt Wetzel as army officer (part 1)/Hermann Göring (part 2)
Hans Stuhrmann as Joseph Goebbels
Eberhard Kratz as Fritz Tarnow
Erich Brauer as Carl Severing
Peter Schorn as Vladimir Lenin
Gerd Jäger as Joseph Stalin (scenes removed)
Steffie Spira as Clara Zetkin
Joe Münch-Harris as Gustav Noske
Hans Flössel as Philipp Scheidemann
Karl-Eugen Lenkerring as Gustav Stresemann
Fred Kötteritzsch as Franz von Papen
Will van Deeg as Heinrich Himmler
Georges Stanescu as Georgi Dimitrov
Theo Shall as judge (part 1)/Marcel Cachin (part 2)
Hubert Temming as Jacques Duclos
Karl Heinz Weiss as Maurice Thorez
Carla Hoffmann as Rosa Thälmann

Production

Background

Ernst Thälmann, the Communist Party of Germany's chief who was executed by the Nazi regime in 1944 after spending 11 years in prison, was revered as a national hero and a martyr in the nascent East Germany. Thälmann's character combined communist convictions with an uncompromising struggle against Fascism; in a broader sense, he served as part of what author Russell Lemmons referred to as East Germany's "foundation myth": the belief that the communists were the most authentic anti-fascists, and therefore, their successors in the Socialist Unity Party of Germany were the legitimate leaders of a new German state. Thälmann became the center of what many historians saw as a cult of personality. This veneration required all controversial aspects of his political career be repressed from mass consciousness. Journalist Erich Wollenberg wrote that in the Ernst Thälmann films, "the Thälmann cult reached its apotheosis."

Inception
The film was conceived in 1948, after the Soviet Occupation Zone's provisional authorities and the leadership of the SED commissioned it; according to director Kurt Maetzig, "it was handed down from above". Willi Bredel and Michael Tschesno-Hell, both political functionaries, were exempted from all their other duties to concentrate on writing the script. A 'Thälmann Committee' was convened to direct the production of the film; its members included representatives from the Ministry of Culture, the Ministry of Press and Agitation, the DEFA studio, and Thälmann's widow, Rosa, although she was removed in 1949. The committee held its first meeting on 8 October 1948. At the third meeting, on the 27th, the members decided that portraying Thälmann's entire life would make the film too cumbersome, agreeing it should concentrate only on the important historical events. The resolution also stated that the plot should focus on meetings between Thälmann and small groups of people, who would be seen embracing Socialism after being convinced by "the radiance of his personality". At the fourth meeting, it was suggested to begin the plot only in 1931 and stress Thälmann's part in the 1932 public transportation strike; yet member Otto Winzer pointed out that in order to appeal to the youth, the picture should deal with the protagonist's earlier years.

Development

Bredel and Tschesno-Hell completed the first draft of the script in early 1951. The plot began with the four-year-old Ernst shoving socialist pamphlets in his trousers to hide them from the police officers who raided his father's tavern, where an illegal meeting of the SPD took place. It also featured his childhood and youth with his parents, his falling in love with the young Rosa Koch and his years as a simple worker who turned to communism.

DEFA concluded that Bredel's and Tschesno-Hell's script would require splitting the film into three parts. This was deemed to long by the committee. After a year of deliberations, most of the original screenplay was rejected. In January 1951, it was decided to have a two-part picture, the first dealing with the time from the end of World War I to 1930, and the second taking off in 1932 and continuing until the founding of the German Democratic Republic. The two parts were named Ernst Thälmann - Sohn des Volkes and Ernst Thälmann - Führer des Volkes (son and leader of the people, respectively). The titles were later changed to Sohn and Führer seiner Klasse.

The political establishment had closely monitored the work. According to historian René Börrner, "no other film, in the years before or after, received such attention from the SED". On 21 August 1951, Walter Ulbricht sent the committee a letter in which he requested that a meeting between Thälmann and Joseph Stalin would be portrayed.

There were other political concerns, as well. Under the influence of events in the Soviet Union, the Ministry of Culture accused the DEFA filmmakers of taking up a Formalistic approach, and demanded they reject it and adopt a Socialist realist line. During 1952, Bredel's and Tschesno-Hell's script was again subject to revisions and had to be rewritten. In July, State Secretary of Press and Agitation Hermann Axen told the Thälmann committee that the main problem to be solved was "The authors' primitive depiction of Thälmann", which failed to present his "grand revolutionary instinct". Later, committee member Hermann Lauter demanded the inclusion of historical events that had no direct connection with Thälmann's life, such as the October Revolution.

Approval

During late 1952, the writers accepted most of the demands. Their final draft was approved by the managerial committee and the Ministry of Culture only on 13 March 1953. The work on the screenplay of Leader of his Class began in summer 1953. Russel Lemmons claimed that this time, the writers "knew what was expected of them". The script was completed on 8 September, and later accepted with only minor changes.

A demonstration of the materials to the first film was held for the State Committee of Cinema on 17 November. The chief of the Soviet commission in East Germany, Vladimir Semyonov, and director Sergei Gerasimov were present as well. Semionov personally made an adjustment to the script; he requested that a scene in which Thälmann appeared to be concerning doubt would be removed, since it was not in accordance with the principles of the proletarian struggle. In general, however, he approved of the presentation; the script also introduced elements fitting the atmosphere of the Cold War, in the form of the films' main villain, the American capitalist Mr. McFuller.

The final version was modeled after Mikheil Chiaureli's 1946 film The Vow and his 1950 The Fall of Berlin, with a color scheme dominated by red. In early 1954, two years after the original deadline, Son of his Class was ready for screening. After the release of the first part, the principal photography of the second was carried out in the summer of 1954. As many as 150 servicemen of the Barracked People's Police were daily used throughout the shooting in the roles of extras.

Reception

Contemporary response

Ernst Thälmann - Son of his Class premiered in the Friedrichstadt Palast, on 9 March 1954; over 3,000 people attended, including Wilhelm Pieck and Walter Ulbricht. In a speech he carried after the screening, Pieck called the film a "message to all peace-loving Germans, especially our youth". The picture was distributed in eighty prints.  It was the first film ever to be released simultaneously in East and West Germany, after the 1954 Berlin Conference brought about a temporary rapprochement between the two states.

The first part was excessively promoted by the press; not infrequently, tickets were handed out without charge, and mandatory screenings were held in collective farms and for school children. Within 13 weeks of its release, Son of his Class was viewed by 3.6 million people. Director Kurt Maetzig, Willi Bredel, Michael Tschesno-Hell, cinematographer Karl Plintzner and actor Günther Simon were all awarded East Germany's National Prize, 1st Class, on 7 October 1954. The film also won a special Peace Prize in the Karlovy Vary International Film Festival, in the same year.

Leader of his Class, that had its premiere in Berlin's Volksbühne on 7 October 1955, was strongly endorsed by the government, as well. Within 13 weeks, it was viewed by 5.7 million people. His appearance in the film won Günther Simon the Best Actor Award in the 1956 Karlovy Vary Festival.

De-Stalinization
Nikita Khrushchev's Secret Speech in February 1956 signalled the beginning of a new course in the politics of the Eastern Bloc, including in the field of art. Joseph Stalin's character, which was celebrated during his lifetime, was now being edited out of many motion pictures; some films made before 1953 were banned altogether.

On 5 June 1956, a month before the 9th Karlovy Vary Festival,  Alexander Abusch wrote the SED Politburo a letter notifying them on the removal of montage featuring Stalin from the film, so it would be fit for screening in Czechoslovakia. Abusch also requested permission to edit out a scene in which Fiete Jansen quoted Stalin's words: "Hitlers come and go, but Germany and the German people remain." After the 1961 22nd Congress of the Communist Party of the Soviet Union, which espoused a strict anti-Stalinist line, a group of officials in the East German Ministry of Culture held a conference from 25 to 27 November 1961. They decided to remove all the footage involving the figure of Stalin from the film. All copies, even those abroad, were subject to the resolution. In the post-1961 version, Stalin does not make an appearance, but his name remains in the opening credits, along with the actor portraying him, and is mentioned on several occasions.

Critical reaction

In East Germany, the films were received with favourable acclaim. On 28 March 1954, Minister of Culture Johannes R. Becher called Son of his Class a "national heroic epic," and a "masterful depiction of history" at an article published in the Tägliche Rundschau newspaper. Berliner Zeitung columnist Joachim Bagemühl wrote that "Maetzig created massive crowd scenes, the likes of which were rarely seen in film hitherto." Journalist Herbert Thiel dubbed the second part "an outstanding film" in a Schweriner Volkszeitung article from 1 October 1955. The Das Volk magazine critic Kurt Steiniger claimed  his "heart beat in coordination with the thousands of people around Thälmann" when he watched the picture. On 18 October, a reporter of the Mitteldeutsche Neuste Nachrichten wrote "not a single person will not ask himself... how is it, that this film touched me so deeply?" Author Henryk Keisch commented: "in the midst of those unprecedentedly monumental scenes... There is a distinct man, with distinct emotions and thoughts... it is a grand work of art." In 1966, the GDR's Cinema Lexicon called Ernst Thälmann a "thrilling and informative document about the indestructible force of the best parts of the German people, successfully recreating... the heroic struggle of the German workers led by Thälmann."

French writer Georges Sadoul praised the series for "presenting Thälmann in a thoroughly human way" in an article published in Les Lettres Françaises on 21 July 1955. In West Germany, a Der Spiegel review from 31 March 1954 dismissed the first part as communist propaganda, calling it "a machine of hate" that is "bearable to watch only due to Kurt Maetzig's mischievous sense for details." The magazine's film critic viewed the second part as "less original and even less well-made." Detlef Kannapin wrote the films were "propagating a myth", intended to "espouse propaganda elements... in a Socialist Realist style" and their main aim was to depict Thälmann as "the great, faultless leader." Seán Allan and John Sandford described it as combining "fact with the officially endorsed distortion of history." Sabine Hake wrote the film was made after Maetzig turned to directing pictures with "straightforward propagandistic intentions." Russell Lemmons concluded that eventually, instead of a story of a simple man rising to greatness, it was a history of the German working movement in the 20th century.

In a 1996 interview, Kurt Maetzig told "I believe the first part is bearable and even has artistic qualities, while the second deteriorated... Due to over-idealization. In many aspects, it is simply embarrassing."

Historical accuracy

Shortly after the script of Son of his Class was approved, DEFA director-general Joseph Schwab told the Thälmann committee members that he was concerned about the veracity of the plot. He pointed out three inaccuracies: in 1918, there were no Workers' and Soldiers' Councils on the Western Front, only inside Germany; the American general accompanying Mr. McFuller could not have been present in Berlin during the crushing of the Spartacus Uprising, since peace with the United States was not achieved yet; and finally, Wilhelm Pieck was not with Rosa Luxemburg and Karl Liebknecht on 9 November 1918. Only Pieck's part was omitted from the screenplay. Bredel told Schwab the rest would be left for the decision of the Politburo. The scenes which the director-general opposed to appear in the film.

In a meeting held in East Berlin's Academy of Sciences on 17 November 1955, West German film critic Klaus Norbert Schäffer told writer Michael Tschesno-Hell the second part focused solely on the communist resistance to the Nazis, ignoring the Social-Democrats and others who opposed the regime. He also mentioned that while Thälmann was incarcerated in three different prisons, the film gives the impression he was held only in one. Another point made by Schäffer was that the arms shipment promised to the communist rebels in Hamburg was intercepted by the army, and not held back by Thälmann's enemies in the party, as seen in Son of his Class. Tschesno-Hell responded to Schäffer by telling: "there are great truths and minor truths. In art, it is completely legitimate to permit the great ones have precedence." René Börrner noted the film skipped over the years between 1924 and 1930, thus ignoring Thälmann's ascendance to the position of party chief - and the many controversies and ideological rifts which characterized the KPD in those days.
  
Journalist Erich Wollenberg, a former member of the KPD, wrote a review of Son of his Class in 1954, in which he claimed the film was a "cocktail of heroic lies and distortions, with few drops of truth mixed in it." He pointed out that, contrary to the film, Thälmann was not on the Western Front when the German Revolution broke out on 5 November 1918, but in Hamburg: this detail was cited in Thälmann's official biography, written by Bredel himself. Wollenberg had found one other discrepancy between the biography and Son of his Class: the real Thälmann played no major role in the struggle against Kapp's supporters.

Historian Detlef Kannapin noted that, while the film portrays Thälmann as seeking to convince the reluctant Social-Democrats to join forces against the Nazis, he never pursued this policy. As late as October 1932, he referred to the SPD as the chief rivals of the communists, and often called them "Social-Fascists". The Comintern's resolution to form an anti-Nazi bond with the Social-Democrats was only made in 1935, when Ernst Thälmann was already imprisoned. According to Kannapin, the figure of Robert Dirhagen, the minor SPD member, symbolizes the Social-Democrat wing of the SED, which united with KPD under Soviet pressure. Seán Allan and John Sandford wrote that in the film, the blame for Hitler's rise was "laid solely on the Social-Democrats", thus justifying the KPD's Stalinist line and its rivalry with the SPD before 1933.

Cultural impact
Mandatory screenings of both parts continued to be held in factories and collective farms years after their release. The films became part of the curriculum in the East German education system, and all the pupils watched them in school. Footage from the movies was used to make eight short films, with lengths ranging from 8 to 27 minutes, that were shown to young children. It held a particularly significant status in the Ernst Thälmann Pioneer Organisation; in 1979, the movement's manual still listed the film as an important source of information about Thälmann's life.

See also
 Karl Liebknecht

Sources
 Sandra Langenhahn: Ursprünge und Ausformung des Thälmannkults. Die DEFA-Filme „Sohn seiner Klasse“ und „Führer seiner Klasse“. In: (Ed.): Leit- und Feindbilder in DDR-Medien (Schriftenreihe Medienberatung Vol. 5). Bundeszentrale für politische Bildung, Bonn 1997, p. 55–65.

Notes

References

External links

.
Sohn seiner Klasse and Führer seiner Klasse on DEFA Sternstunden.

1954 films
1955 films
1950s biographical films
German biographical films
German epic films
East German films
1950s German-language films
Films about communism
Films directed by Kurt Maetzig
Anti-fascist propaganda films
Films about anti-fascism
Films set in the 1910s
Films set in the 1920s
Films set in the 1930s
Films set in the 1940s
Cultural depictions of Adolf Hitler
Cultural depictions of Hermann Göring
Cultural depictions of Joseph Goebbels
Cultural depictions of Heinrich Himmler
Cultural depictions of Karl Liebknecht
Cultural depictions of Rosa Luxemburg
Cultural depictions of Vladimir Lenin
Cultural depictions of Joseph Stalin
Western Front (World War I) films
Eastern Front of World War II films
Films set in Hamburg
1950s German films
German propaganda films